Ormiston is an organized hamlet in Excel Rural Municipality No. 71, Saskatchewan, Canada. The population was 25 at the 2011 Census. It is located in the south-central portion of the province, south of the city of Moose Jaw.

Demographics 

Climate

See also

 List of communities in Saskatchewan
 Hamlets of Saskatchewan

References

Designated places in Saskatchewan
Excel No. 71, Saskatchewan
Organized hamlets in Saskatchewan
Division No. 3, Saskatchewan